William John McCool (July 14, 1944 – June 8, 2014) was an American professional baseball player. The left-handed pitcher played most of his seven-year, Major League Baseball career with the Cincinnati Reds and spent a year each with the San Diego Padres and St. Louis Cardinals.

Born in Batesville, Indiana, McCool went to nearby Lawrenceburg High School in Lawrenceburg, where the McCools lived. He graduated from LHS in 1962 and was signed by the Reds as an amateur free agent in 1963.

He started his pro career in 1963, playing Class-D ball for the Reds organization in Tampa, Florida and later that year made the jump to the then-Triple-A San Diego Padres.

He made his major league debut at the young age of 19 on April 24, 1964. The first batter he faced was Jesús Alou (who singled) as McCool pitched two innings in relief of Al Worthington in a 15-5 Reds loss to the San Francisco Giants at Cincinnati's Crosley Field. That year he was named The Sporting News National League Rookie Pitcher of the Year.

In 1965 and 1966 he was second in the National League in saves and in 1966 he was named a National League All-Star. He appeared in a career-high 62 games in 1965.

He was among the players drafted by the San Diego Padres in the 1968 MLB expansion draft. He appeared in 54 games for the Padres in their inaugural season of 1969. Just prior to the 1970 season he was traded to the Cardinals, with whom he pitched 18 games. In the offseason after the 1970 season (which would be his last in the majors, at age 25), he was traded to the Boston Red Sox and later to the Kansas City Royals, but he did not appear for either team in the majors.

After retiring from baseball in 1970 McCool moved to Centerville, Ohio where he raised his family.  He worked for three years (1972–74) as a sports anchor for WKEF-TV in Dayton.  McCool's book, The Billy McCool Pitching Digest: A Guide to Effective Baseball Pitching, was published in 1977. He lived in Summerfield, Florida after retiring in 2004. In 2013, he was inducted into the Indiana Baseball Hall of Fame as a 1962 graduate of Lawrenceburg High School.

McCool died in his Summerfield, Florida home on June 8, 2014.

References

External links

1944 births
2014 deaths
Baseball players from Indiana
Cincinnati Reds players
Major League Baseball pitchers
National League All-Stars
Omaha Royals players
People from Centerville, Ohio
People from Batesville, Indiana
People from Lawrenceburg, Indiana
People from Marion County, Florida
Portland Beavers players
St. Louis Cardinals players
San Diego Padres (minor league) players
San Diego Padres players
Tampa Tarpons (1957–1987) players
Tulsa Oilers (baseball) players
Television personalities from Ohio
American sports announcers